The 12259 / 12260 Sealdah - Bikaner Duronto Express is a premium train of the Duronto Express category belonging to Indian Railways - Eastern Railway zone that runs between Sealdah and Bikaner in India.It operates as train number 12259 from Sealdah to Bikaner and as train number 12260 in the reverse direction serving the states of West Bengal, Jharkhand, Uttar Pradesh, Delhi, Haryana and Rajasthan. It used to run as New Delhi - Sealdah Duronto Express and was the first Duronto Express to be launched as announced in the Railway budget of 2008/09. On 24 February 2020, it was extended beyond New Delhi to Bikaner, thereby becoming not only the first Duronto service to Bikaner but also one connecting New Delhi and Bikaner. It was the fastest Duronto Express in India when it operated from Sealdah to New Delhi.

Coaches
The 12259 / 60 Sealdah Bikaner Duronto Express presently has one AC First Class, four AC 2 tier, twelve AC 3 tier, two End on Generator Car & one Pantry car coach.

As is customary with most train services in India, Coach Composition may be amended at the discretion of Indian Railways depending on demand.

Service
As the average speed of the train is above , as per Indian Railways rules, its fare includes a superfast surcharge.

Routing & Technical Halts
The 12259/12260 Sealdah - Bikaner Duronto Express runs from Sealdah via Dhanbad Junction, PT. Deen Dayal Upadhyay Junction, Kanpur Central, New Delhi, Loharu, Sadulpur, Churu, Ratangarh to Bikaner Junction

Traction

Termination
The train was terminated by Indian Railways after its final run from Bikaner to Sealdah on 24 May 2021, due to low occupancy and safety compromises amidst the COVID-19 pandemic.
The train again started its run from 9 June 2021 .

Gallery

References

External links
Official website of Indian Railways

Duronto Express trains
Rail transport in West Bengal
Rail transport in Jharkhand
Rail transport in Uttar Pradesh
Rail transport in Haryana
Rail transport in Rajasthan
Railway services introduced in 2009
Transport in Delhi
Transport in Kolkata
Rail transport in Delhi